Miguel Leyva Río De La Loza (born 4 April 2001) is a Mexican professional footballer who plays as a midfielder for Liga MX club América.

Club career
On 31 January 2020, América registered Leyva as part of their official roster as their last signing for the season. Leyva spent the last football year playing for Spanish football team CD Toledo B in which he was used as a midfielder and a forward and scored 19 goals for the team.

References

2001 births
Living people
Mexican expatriate footballers
Club América footballers
Association football midfielders
Mexican expatriate sportspeople in Spain
Expatriate footballers in Spain
Footballers from the State of Mexico
Mexican footballers